Todd Duffey (born Robert Gordon Duffey; April 9, 1974) is an American actor. He was born in Raleigh, North Carolina and grew up in Texas where he studied and performed in theater.

Career
Duffey is best known for his role as Brian, the Chotchkie's waiter in the 1999 comedy Office Space.  Among his other projects, he appeared in a recurring role in 2001 in Buffy the Vampire Slayer.

Filmography

Film

 Across Five Aprils (1990) as Jethro Creighton
 In the Name of Love: A Texas Tragedy (1995) as Davey Coombs
 Carried Away (1996) as Young Joseph
 Office Space (1999) as Brian
 The Black Rose (2000) as Kyle
 Buttleman (2003) as Harold's Boss
 Barney: Let's Go to the Zoo (2003) as Scooter McNutty
 Burning Annie (2004) as Tommy
 The SpongeBob SquarePants Movie (2004) as Concession Guy (voice)
 Slaughterhouse of the Rising Sun (2005) as Robert Lewis
 Hollywood Kills (2006) as Ken Vincent
 The Last Lovecraft: Relic of Cthulhu (2009) as Cult member #1
 Death Inc. (2011) as Plumber Jim
 God's Country (2012) as Adam
 Steel Cherry (2012) as Marvin Steel

Television

 Walker, Texas Ranger (1 episode, 1995) as Paul Kelly Moore
 Barney & Friends (47 episodes, 1997–2000) as Scooter McNutty
 ER (1 episode, 2000) as Mitch
 Buffy the Vampire Slayer (6 episodes, 2001) as Murk
 The Drew Carey Show (1 episode, 2002) as Prom DJ
 George Lopez (1 episode, 2003) as Teenage Boy
 Charmed (1 episode, 2003) as Satyr
 The O'Keefes (1 episode) as Beer Guy
 That '70s Show (1 episode, 2004) as Guy #2

Video game

 Tony Hawk's Project 8 (2006) (as Robert Duffey)

Recognition
In 1991, Duffey received a Western Heritage Award from the National Cowboy Museum for his starring role as Jethro Creighton in the 1990 film Across Five Aprils adapted from the Irene Hunt novel of the same name.

References

External links
 

Male actors from North Carolina
Living people
1974 births